The First Gutwein Ministry was a Ministry of the Government of Tasmania, led by Peter Gutwein of the Tasmanian Liberals. It was formed on 20 January 2020, after the resignation of Will Hodgman as Premier of Tasmania and the election of Gutwein as Liberal leader. It was replaced by the Second Gutwein Ministry following the 2021 state election.

References

Tasmanian ministries